Wuthering Heights is a 1998 British television film directed by David Skynner and starring Robert Cavanah, Orla Brady, and Sarah Smart. It was produced by Jo Wright. It is based on the 1847 novel Wuthering Heights by Emily Brontë. The novel was adapted for the screen by Neil McKay. The film was released by ITV on 5 April 1998 in the United Kingdom and released by WGBH-TV on 18 October 1998 in the United States.

Four years later, Smart would star in Sparkhouse, a gender-reversed BBC adaptation of Wuthering Heights in which Smart played the Heathcliff role (renamed to Carol).

Plot summary
Mr Earnshaw takes in Heathcliff, a mistreated foundling, and raises him alongside his stepsister Catherine. The two develop a romantic relationship, but Catherine ultimately decides to marry a wealthy man. Heathcliff becomes fixated on seeking revenge and this obsession carries over into the following generation.

Cast
 Robert Cavanah as Heathcliff
 Peter Davison as Joseph Lockwood
 Orla Brady as Cathy Earnshaw
 Tom Georgeson as Joseph
 Matthew Macfadyen as Hareton Earnshaw
 Sarah Smart as Catherine Linton
 Kadie Savage as young Cathy Earnshaw
 Ken Kitson as Mr. Earnshaw
 Flora Montgomery as Isabella Linton
 Ian Shaw as Hindley Earnshaw
 Crispin Bonham-Carter as Edgar Linton
 David Maybrick as Gaddick
 Catherine Cheshire as Frances Earnshaw
 Polly Hemingway as Nelly Dean

References

External links 
 
 

1998 films
Films set in the 19th century
1998 romantic drama films
Films based on Wuthering Heights
London Weekend Television shows
Television series by ITV Studios
ITV television dramas
British romantic drama films
1990s English-language films
1990s British films
British drama television films